Josie Pamiutu Papialuk (surname variously spelled as Papialook and Paperk) (1918–1996) was an Inuit artist who lived in Puvirnituq, Quebec.

Early life 
He was born in the Issuksiuvit Lake area of Quebec.

Career 
He worked in printmaking (including in the Povungnituk print shop), and sculpted as well.

His work is held in a variety of museums, including the National Gallery of Canada, the British Museum, the University of Michigan Museum of Art, the Canadian Museum of History, the Musée national des beaux-arts du Québec, the Montreal Museum of Fine Arts, and the McMaster Museum of Art.

References 

1918 births
1996 deaths
Inuit printmakers
Inuit sculptors
20th-century Canadian sculptors
Canadian printmakers
Sculptors from Quebec
Inuit from Quebec
People from Nunavik
20th-century Canadian printmakers